DLW can stand for:

 the Delaware, Lackawanna and Western Railroad in the United States
 the Delhi Waveriders, a field hockey franchise based in Delhi
 Doubly labeled water, water made of uncommon isotopes, used for tracing purposes